Nancy Casallas (born 21 October 1981) is a Colombian former professional racing cyclist. She won the Colombian National Road Race Championships in 2002.

References

External links
 

1981 births
Living people
Colombian female cyclists
Place of birth missing (living people)
21st-century Colombian women